Mark Fynn (born April 16, 1985) is a professional Zimbabwean tennis player.

Career

Mark Fynn has primarily spent his time on the Futures circuit. He has also represented Zimbabwe in Davis Cup action.

He attended the University of Tennessee at Chattanooga from 2003 - 2006.

Played No. 1 singles for The McCallie School in Chattanooga where he compiled a 12-3 singles record as a senior. He played No. 2 doubles and posted a 13-1 doubles mark. He went 15-0 in tournament play. Coached at McCallie by Eric Voges. Held No. 1 singles ranking among Under-18 Tennessee Boys. Prior to The McCallie School he also attended St. John's College in Harare where he was a member of the cricket team.

In the 1st Round of the 2015 Davis Cup Group II Europe/Africa, he partnered with Wayne Black.

Future and Challenger finals

Doubles 10 (2 titles, 8 runners-up)

Davis Cup Record

References

External links

1985 births
Living people
Zimbabwean male tennis players
Sportspeople from Harare
White Zimbabwean sportspeople
Alumni of St. John's College (Harare)
African Games bronze medalists for Zimbabwe
African Games medalists in tennis
Competitors at the 2011 All-Africa Games
Competitors at the 2015 African Games